Piet Hut (born September 26, 1952) is a Dutch-American astrophysicist, who divides his time between research in computer simulations of dense stellar systems and broadly interdisciplinary collaborations, ranging from other fields in natural science to computer science, cognitive psychology and philosophy.

He is currently the Head of the Program in Interdisciplinary Studies at the Institute for Advanced Study (IAS) in Princeton, New Jersey, USA. Asteroid 17031 Piethut is named after him, in honor of his work in planetary dynamics and for co-founding the B612 Foundation, which focuses on prevention of asteroid impacts on Earth.

Career
In the Netherlands, Hut did a double PhD program, at Utrecht University, in particle physics under Martinus Veltman and in Amsterdam in astrophysics under Ed van den Heuvel, resulting in a PhD at the University of Amsterdam.

Previously an assistant professor at the University of California, Berkeley, Hut was in 1985, at the age of 32, appointed as a full professor at the Institute for Advanced Study. At the time, he was the youngest professor appointed there.

Hut became a corresponding member of the Royal Netherlands Academy of Arts and Sciences in 1996.

Astrophysics research
An accomplished astrophysicist, Hut is best known for the Barnes–Hut simulation algorithm, developed with Joshua Barnes.  By using a tree-based data structure, the Barnes–Hut method significantly speeds up the calculation of the gravitational motion of large numbers of stars, making accessible such problems as collisions between galaxies. Barnes–Hut simulation algorithm, which has become a standard in N-body problems, reduces its complexity to N log N.

Hut introduced the concept of pseudo-synchronicity, which is now widely cited in the literature on tidal evolution of exoplanets.

He co-authored a graduate textbook "The Gravitational Million Body Problem"., invented a mathematical sequence called Piet Hut's "coat-hanger" sequence, and has pioneered the use of virtual worlds for research and education in (astro)physics.

Hut is one of the founders of the B612 Foundation, MODEST, MICA, ACS, the GRAPE (Gravity Pipe) project, and AMUSE.

Interdisciplinary research
Hut's broadly interdisciplinary research
started with his study of an asteroid impact to explain the demise of the dinosaurs, when he edited a review article for Nature with four paleontologists, two geologists and one other astrophysicist.
He has also widely engaged in joint research with computer scientists
and philosophers and cognitive psychologists.

In recognition of his work, he was invited to participate in various conferences, spanning a range from a workshop with the 14th Dalai Lama and five physicists in Dharamsala, India
to the World Economic Forum in Davos, Switzerland, and he has been invited as a member of the Husserl Circle.

Hut is one of the founders of the Kira Institute.

Employment controversy
In July, 2000, IAS sued Hut in federal district court, seeking to enforce a 1996 agreement in which Hut had promised to resign by mid-2001. According to IAS Director Phillip Griffiths, Hut had been hired in expectation of his eventually succeeding professor John N. Bahcall as leader of the astrophysics group, but "was not performing" at the required level.
Hut's rebuttal was first, that his work was not inferior but only (to some eyes) unfashionable, and second, that he had been coerced into signing any agreement.  Many prominent astrophysicists defended the quality of Hut's work, while others based their support on the importance of academic tenure to creative scholarship.  The case was eventually settled out of court, with Hut transferring out of IAS's School of Natural Sciences while being appointed Head of a new Program in Interdisciplinary Studies.

See also
Barnes–Hut simulation
n-body problem
Institute for Advanced Study
Large-scale structure of the cosmos
Galaxy formation and evolution

References

External links
 Publication List 
 Interview for Seeds of Unfolding
 Videos
 Brainwave 2010: Does Chaos Have Meaning? Discussion with film maker Shekhar Kapur
 Presentation "Science Beyond Methods and Goals"
 
 Panel Discussion at Mind & Reality
 Interview at Columbia University
 
 

1952 births
Living people
20th-century Dutch astronomers
Dutch emigrants to the United States 
Princeton University faculty
University of California, Berkeley faculty
University of Amsterdam alumni
Institute for Advanced Study faculty
Utrecht University alumni
Scientists from Utrecht (city)
Members of the Royal Netherlands Academy of Arts and Sciences
21st-century American astronomers